Mari Rhiannon Lövgreen (born August 25, 1983) is a Welsh television presenter.

Born and bred in Caernarfon, Lövgreen began her career in November 2004 as a presenter for S4C's flagship youth magazine programme, Uned 5, produced by independent production company Antena Television. Before joining the presenting team, she worked for the programme as a phone-in operator. Lovgreen also presented special documentaries for the show from Peru, Melbourne and Thailand. She made her last appearance as an Uned 5 presenter on 17 July 2009.

Since her presenting debut, she has been a regular on various S4C programmes including the quiz show Waaa!!! (as an out-of-vision presenter), reality series Y Briodas Fawr (The Big Wedding), light entertainment show Noson Lawen, antiques series Cyfnewid and S4C's Urdd Eisteddfod and National Eisteddfod coverage as both a studio anchor and correspondent.

A winner of the BAFTA Cymru Best Newcomer in 2006, Lövgreen's father is the acclaimed Welsh singer-songwriter, Geraint Lövgreen.

Following her departure from Uned 5, she began studying on a teacher training course at Aberystwyth University, before becoming a teacher at a primary school in Llangadfan, Powys.

References

External links
UKGameShows.com - Mari Lövgreen profile

Welsh television presenters
Welsh women television presenters
Welsh-language television presenters
Living people
People from Caernarfon
1983 births